A list of the most notable films produced in Bulgaria during the 1950s ordered by year of release. For an alphabetical list of articles on Bulgarian films see :Category:Bulgarian films.

Number and awards
Bulgaria produced 39 films, either alone or with other countries, during the 1950s. Four of thоse (Geroite na Shipka in co-production with the Soviet Union, Tochka parva, Zemya and Sterne in co-production with East Germany) got a Golden palm nomination at the Cannes Film Festival. Geroite na Shipka (1955), Pod Igoto (1952) and Trevoga (1951) went on to become some of the most viewed Bulgarian films. Geroite na Shipka got 5,8 mill views and ranks second in the all-time Bulgarian rang-list, Pod Igoto is 5th with 5 mill views and ''Trevoga – 10th with 3,8 mill.

Notable actors
The most notable actors from the period were Ivan Dimov ("Kalin orelat", "Pod igoto", "Geratzite"), Konstantin Kisimov ("Kalin orelat", "Pod igoto", "Tochka parva", "Geroite na Shipka") and Apostol Karamitev ("Pod igoto", "Geroite na Shipka", "Lyubimetz 13").

List

References
General
 
 The Internet movie database

Specific

1950s
Films
Bulgaria